Argyripnus atlanticus is a species of ray-finned fish in the genus Argyripnus.

The fish is found worldwide in the tropical waters of the Eastern Atlantic, from Madeira to south of the Canary Islands. In the Western Atlantic, in the Bahamas and the Caribbean Sea. In the Eastern Central Pacific, it is found in Hawaii.

References

Quéro, J.-C., J.C. Njock and M.M. de la Hoz, 1990. Sternoptychidae. p. 275-282. In J.C. Quero, J.C. Hureau, C. Karrer, A. Post and L. Saldanha (eds.) Check-list of the fishes of the eastern tropical Atlantic (CLOFETA). JNICT, Lisbon; SEI, Paris; and UNESCO, Paris. Vol. 1. 

Taxa named by Günther Maul
Fish described in 1952
Sternoptychidae